Ponta Delgada - João Paulo II Airport , named after Pope John Paul II, is an international airport located on the island of São Miguel, in the Portuguese archipelago of the Azores. The terminal was finished in 1995; by 2005 the airport served a total of 873,500 passengers. It has scheduled domestic flights to all islands of the Azores, plus Madeira and the mainland, namely (Lisbon, Porto and Faro). João Paulo II Airport also accommodates international flights to and from Europe and North America. The airport is the major hub for the SATA Group of airlines, which includes both inter-island SATA Air Açores and international Azores Airlines, and since April 2015 as a base for Ryanair.

History

The airport was inaugurated on 24 August 1969 by President Admiral Américo Tomás, after its construction was planned six years earlier, in 1963. It was built in order to serve inter-island connections and the continent, using a single Boeing 737 from the national flag carrier (TAP33). Regular flights to Lisbon began two years later.

In May 1995, at the inauguration of the airport terminal, the facility received the designation João Paulo II, in honour of the visit of the Pope to the Azores in 1991.

"This airport, is part of the integrated history and economic and social development of the Azores, in particular of the Micaelenses, and constitutes an relevant equipment at the service of air transport, not just of the passengers, but also the transport and mail. It is the infrastructure with the largest expression of air traffic in the autonomous region of the Azores, reaching in 2011 935,000 passengers."

Along with the airports in Lisbon, Porto, Faro, Flores, Santa Maria, Horta and Beja, the airport's concessions to provide support to civil aviation was conceded to ANA Aeroportos de Portugal on 18 December 1998, under provisions of decree 404/98. With this concession, ANA was also in charge of future planning, development and construction of future infrastructures.

Airlines and destinations
The following airlines operate regular scheduled and charter flights at Ponta Delgada Airport:

Statistics

Incidents
 A Delta Air Lines Boeing 757, operating Delta Flight 414 from JFK International Airport in New York City, suffered a hard landing on 18 August 2019. No injuries were reported but the airplane was damaged substantially.

See also
 Aviation in the Azores
 John Paul II International Airport Kraków–Balice
 Bari Karol Wojtyła Airport

References
Notes

Sources

External links

 Official website
 

Buildings and structures in Ponta Delgada
Airports in the Azores
Pope John Paul II